Sella is a surname. Notable people with the surname include:

 Andrea Sella, Italian chemist
 Aviem Sella, Israeli fighter pilot
 Brian Sella, singer - songwriter for the band The Front Bottoms
 Elis Sella (1930–1992), Finnish actor 
 Emanuele Sella (born 1981), Italian road-racing cyclist
 Ezio Sella (born 1956), Italian football coach and former player 
 Gabriele Sella (1963–2010), Italian cyclist at the 1984 Olympics in the sprint event
 Gev Sella, Israeli off-road motorcyclist
 Philippe Sella, French Rugby Union player
 Quintino Sella, Italian statesman
 Seela Sella (born 1936), Finnish actress 
 Vittorio Sella, Italian mountaineer and photographer

Italian-language surnames